Playtone (stylized on-screen as PLAY•TONE; a.k.a. Playtone Productions and The Playtone Company) is an American film and television production company established in 1998 by actor Tom Hanks and producer Gary Goetzman.

It was named after the fictional record company of the same name in the 1996 film That Thing You Do!, written and directed by Hanks; it also uses the same company logo, typically revealed on-screen with a brief instrumental snippet of the titular song itself, with some variations in each film depending on subject manner. The success of the film served as a spring-board to launch an actual Playtone Records label. Playtone has had an exclusive television development deal with HBO since the company was formed. Over the course of that time, Playtone's projects for HBO have won 46 Emmy Awards, while garnering 113 Emmy Award nominations.

Films

Television series

Web series

Playtone Records releases
 That Thing You Do! soundtrack (1996)
 The Sopranos soundtrack
 The Sopranos: Peppers & Eggs soundtrack
 Bring It On soundtrack (2000)
 Josie and the Pussycats soundtrack (2001)
 Band of Brothers soundtrack (2001)
 My Big Fat Greek Wedding soundtrack (2002)
 The Truth About Charlie soundtrack (2002)
 Starter for 10 soundtrack (2006)

See also
 List of record labels

References

External links

Film production companies of the United States
Television production companies of the United States
American record labels
Playtone productions
Record labels established in 1996
Mass media companies established in 1998
Companies based in Santa Monica, California
1996 establishments in California